Rahe Tera Aashirwaad (English: May your blessings be always with me) is an Indian television series which premiered on Colors on 21 July 2008. The story portrays the life of an orphan girl who fights evil with the grace of Goddess Vaishno Devi.

Cast
 Snigdha Srivastava as Bhakti
 Akshay Sethi as Akshat Bali
 Indira Krishnan as Guru Mata
 Sonali Verma as Durga Mata
 Shahbaz Khan as Bali
 Ajaz Khan as Tej Bali
 Sonica Handa as Shalaka Tej Bali
 Vipra Rawa as Aparajita Bali

References

Colors TV original programming
Indian drama television series
Indian fantasy television series
2008 Indian television series debuts
2009 Indian television series endings